Leonid Davydovich Lukov (2 May 1909 – 24 April 1963) was a Soviet film director and screenwriter. He directed 25 films between 1930 and 1963. Leonid Lukov was named People's Artist of the RSFSR in 1957 and awarded the Stalin Prize twice: in 1941 and 1952. He died in Leningrad.

Filmography
 Scum (Накипь); 1930, short
 Komsomol is my Motherland (Родина моя — комсомол); 1931, documentary
 Roots of Commune (Корешки коммуны); 1931
 Italian (Итальянка); 1931
 Eshelon No... (Эшелон №...); 1932
 Youth (Молодость); 1934
 I Love (Я люблю); 1936
 Director (Директор); 1938
 A Great Life, Part 1 (Большая жизнь, 1 серия); 1939
 Nother (Мать); 1941, short
 Alexander Parkhomenko (Александр Пархоменко); 1942
 Two Soldiers (Два бойца); 1943
 It Happened in the Donbass (Это было в Донбассе); 1945
 A Great Life, Part 2 (Большая жизнь, 2 серия); 1946
 Private Aleksandr Matrosov (Рядовой Александр Матросов); 1947
 Miners of the Don (Донецкие шахтеры); 1950
 Vassa Zheleznova (Васса Железнова); 1953
 Barbarians (Варвары); 1953
 Least We Forget (Об этом забывать нельзя); 1954
 To a New Shore (К новому берегу); 1955
 Different Fortunes (Разные судьбы); 1956
 Aleksa Dundić (Олеко Дундич); 1958
 Two Lives (Две жизни); 1961
 Trust me, People (Верьте мне, люди); 1964

References

External links

1909 births
1963 deaths
People from Mariupol
People from Yekaterinoslav Governorate
Communist Party of the Soviet Union members
Soviet film directors
Recipients of the Order of Lenin
Stalin Prize winners
People's Artists of the RSFSR
Soviet screenwriters
Burials at Novodevichy Cemetery